Jerome Gary Cooper (born October 2, 1936) is a former officer of the United States Marine Corps who served as Assistant Secretary of the Air Force (Manpower & Reserve Affairs) from 1989 to 1992, and as United States Ambassador to Jamaica from 1994 to 1997.

Biography

Cooper was born on October 2, 1936, in Lafayette, Louisiana. He later attended Most Pure Heart of Mary High School in Mobile, Alabama, graduating in 1954. He was then educated at the University of Notre Dame, receiving a B.S. degree in finance in 1958. The June 1958 commencement program lists him as Gary Mouton Cooper (Mouton was his mother's maiden name).

After participating in Naval ROTC during college, Cooper joined the United States Marine Corps. During the Vietnam War, he became the first African American to ever command a Marine Corps infantry company. He left the Marine Corps in 1970. During his time in the Marine Corps, he was awarded the Navy Distinguished Service Medal, the Legion of Merit, the Bronze Star Medal, two Purple Hearts and three Republic of Vietnam Gallantry Crosses.

In 1970, Cooper left the Marine Corps, though he continued to serve as a major in the United States Marine Corps Reserve. From 1970, he was director of an insurance company and funeral home that had been owned by his family for decades in Mobile, Alabama. He was elected to the Alabama Legislature in 1973. In 1978, the Governor of Alabama named Cooper to his cabinet, with Cooper becoming Commissioner of the Alabama State Department of Human Resources.

Cooper attended the program for Senior Executives in Government at Harvard University in 1979. He joined David Volkert and Associates, a regional engineering and architectural firm in Mobile, Alabama, as vice president for marketing in 1981.

In 1988, Cooper returned to active duty in the Marine Corps, being promoted to major general and becoming director of personnel at Headquarters Marine Corps. He retired from the Marine Corps in 1989, when President of the United States George H. W. Bush nominated Cooper to be Assistant Secretary of the Air Force (Manpower & Reserve Affairs) and, after Senate confirmation, he held this office until 1992. In this capacity, he played a role in planning the Gulf War.

Cooper returned to David Volkert and associates in 1992. In 1994, President Bill Clinton named Cooper United States Ambassador to Jamaica, and Cooper presented his credentials to Governor-General of Jamaica Sir Howard Cooke on November 4, 1994. He left his post as ambassador on November 27, 1997.

Cooper returned to his home in Mobile in December 1997. He later became CEO of Commonwealth National Bank, and has served on the Board of Directors of GenCorp, U.S. Steel, Protective Life, and PNC Financial Services.

Personal life 
Cooper is the son of Algernon Johnson Cooper Sr. (June 29, 1908 – November 6, 1968) and Gladys Catherine (Mouton) Cooper (December 10, 1910 – April 1, 1989).

Cooper is Catholic, and his family was the first to have three generations of African Americans attend Notre Dame.

His siblings include Algernon J. Cooper Jr., one of the first Black mayors in the nation, and Peggy Cooper Cafritz, a notable civil rights activist.

Cooper is divorced and has a son and two daughters.

References

External links
 Embassy of the United States – Kingston, Jamaica
 

1936 births
Living people
People from Lafayette, Louisiana
African-American Catholics
People from Mobile, Alabama
Mendoza College of Business alumni
African-American United States Navy personnel
United States Marine Corps personnel of the Vietnam War
American businesspeople
Members of the Alabama House of Representatives
Recipients of the Legion of Merit
United States Marine Corps generals
United States Air Force civilians
African-American diplomats
Ambassadors of the United States to Jamaica
21st-century African-American people
African Americans in the Vietnam War
20th-century African-American people